is a  mountain on the border of Sakaide and Marugame in Kagawa Prefecture, Japan.

Outline
Mount Iino is also called Sanuki Fuji because of its resemblance to Mount Fuji.

This mountain is one of the Continued 100 Famous Japanese Mountains.

Access
By bus or walk from Sakaide Station or Marugame Station.

References

Tourist attractions in Kagawa Prefecture
Landforms of Kagawa Prefecture